Wilhelm Fried Fuchs (January 1, 1879 – May 8, 1952), commonly and better known as William Fox, was an American film industry executive who founded the Fox Film Corporation in 1915 and the Fox West Coast Theatres chain in the 1920s. Although he lost control of his film businesses in 1930, his name was used by 20th Century Fox (now 20th Century Studios) and continues to be used in the trademarks of the present-day Fox Corporation, including the Fox Broadcasting Company, Fox News, Fox Sports and Foxtel.

Early life
Fox was born in Tolcsva, Hungary, and originally named Wilhelm Fried Fuchs. His parents, Michael Fuchs and Anna Fried, were both Hungarian Jews. The family immigrated to the United States when William was nine months old and settled in New York City, where they had twelve more children, of whom only six survived. With his family largely destitute, William found himself as a youth forced to sell candy in Central Park, work as a newsboy, and in the fur and garment industry. At eight, he fell off the back of an ice truck, breaking his left arm; subsequent treatment left it permanently impaired.

Film career
In 1900, Fox started his own company, which he sold in 1904 to purchase his first nickelodeon. Always more of an entrepreneur than a showman, he concentrated on acquiring and building theaters. Following the purchase of his first nickelodeon, Fox would then use it to create a chain of movie theaters and purchase film prints from major film companies at the time such as Biograph, Essanay, Kalem, Lubin, Pathé, Selig, Phonoson-Coles, Tsereteli and Vitagraph. In 1910, Fox managed to successfully lease the New York Academy of Music and convert it into a movie theater. He also continued to focus his concentration in New York and New Jersey. Beginning in 1914, New Jersey-based Fox bought films outright from the Balboa Amusement Producing Company in Long Beach, California, for distribution to his own theaters and then for rental to other theaters across the country. He formed the Fox Film Corporation on February 1, 1915, with insurance and banking money provided by the McCarter, Kuser and Usar families of Newark, New Jersey, and the small New Jersey investment house of Eisele and King. The company's first film studio was leased in Fort Lee, New Jersey, where many other early film studios were based at the beginning of the 20th century. He now had the capital to acquire facilities and expand his production capacity. Between 1915 and 1919, Fox would rake in millions of dollars through films which featured Fox Film's first breakout star Theda Bara, known as "The Vamp", for her performance in A Fool There Was (1915), based on the 1909 Broadway production A Fool There Was by Porter Emerson Browne, in turn based on Rudyard Kipling's poem The Vampire, in turn inspired by Philip Burne-Jones's painting, The Vampire (1897), modelled by Mrs Patrick Campbell, Burne-Jones' lover and George Bernard Shaw's "second famed platonic love affair".

In 1925–1926, Fox purchased the rights to the work of Freeman Harrison Owens, the U.S. rights to the Tri-Ergon system invented by three German inventors (Josef Engl (1893–1942), Hans Vogt (1890–1979), and Joseph Massolle (1889–1957)), and the work of Theodore Case to create the Fox Movietone sound-on-film system, introduced in 1927 with the release of F. W. Murnau's Sunrise: A Song of Two Humans. Sound-on-film systems such as Movietone and RCA Photophone soon became the standard, and competing sound-on-disc technologies, such as Warner Bros.' Vitaphone, became obsolete. From 1928 to 1964, Fox Movietone News was one of the major newsreel series in the U.S., along with The March of Time (1935–1951) and Universal Newsreel (1929–1967). Despite the fact that his film studio was based in Hollywood, Fox opted to instead remain in New York and was more familiar with his financiers than with either his movie makers or movie stars. Prominent Fox Film Corporation actress Janet Gaynor even acknowledged that she barely knew William Fox, stating "I only met him to say how do you do." Gaynor also stated that Fox would rarely visit the Fox studio in Hollywood she frequently worked in when she worked with Fox's company and that his movies were mainly managed by his movie makers.

Following the 1927 death of Marcus Loew, head of the parent company of rival studio Metro-Goldwyn-Mayer, control of MGM passed to his longtime associate, Nicholas Schenck. Fox saw an opportunity to expand his empire, and in 1929, with Schenck's assent, bought the Loew family's MGM holdings, unbeknownst to MGM studio bosses Louis B. Mayer and Irving Thalberg who were outraged, since, despite their high posts at MGM, they were not shareholders. Mayer used his strong political connections to persuade the Justice Department to sue Fox for violating federal antitrust laws. During this time, in mid–1929, Fox was badly hurt in an automobile accident. By the time he recovered, the stock market crash in October 1929 had wiped out virtually his entire  fortune, ending any chance of the Loews-Fox merger going through even if the Justice Department had approved it.

Fox lost control of his organization in 1930 during a hostile takeover. In 1935, Fox Film Corporation would merge with 20th Century Pictures, becoming 20th Century-Fox, and, after the 2019 purchase by The Walt Disney Company, "20th Century Studios." William Fox never had any involvement with the film studio that famously bore his name. A combination of the stock market crash, Fox's car accident injuries, and government antitrust action, forced him into a protracted seven-year legal battle to stave off bankruptcy. At his bankruptcy hearing in 1936, he attempted to bribe judge John Warren Davis and committed perjury.  In 1943, Fox served a five-month and seventeen day sentence on charges of conspiring to obstruct justice and defraud the United States, in connection with his bankruptcy. Years after his prison release, U.S. President Harry Truman would grant Fox a Presidential pardon.

For many years, Fox resented the way that Wall Street had forced him from control of his company. In 1933, he collaborated with the writer Upton Sinclair on a book Upton Sinclair Presents William Fox in which Fox recounted his life, and stating his views on what he considered to be a large Wall Street conspiracy against him.

His death in 1952 at the age of 73 went largely unnoticed by the film industry; no one from Hollywood attended his funeral. Fox is interred at Salem Fields Cemetery, Brooklyn.

Fox personally oversaw the construction of many Fox Theatres in American cities including Atlanta, St Louis, Detroit, Oakland, San Francisco and San Diego.

His companies had an estimated value of $300,000,000 and he personally owned 53 percent of Fox Film and 93 percent of the Fox Theaters.

Personal life
Fox was married to Eva Leo (1881–1962) and had two daughters.

References

Sources

External links
 
 
 Historical Article on William Fox
 

1879 births
1952 deaths
American film production company founders
American Jews
Jewish film people
American people convicted of bribery
American people of Hungarian-Jewish descent
Austro-Hungarian emigrants to the United States
Burials at Salem Fields Cemetery
Fox Film
Hungarian Jews
People from Borsod-Abaúj-Zemplén County